The West Africa Study Circle (WASC) is the "international specialist society for the study of stamps, postal stationery and postal history of West Africa."

The Circle publishes a regular journal, Cameo, and books and monographs.

The principal areas covered by the society are the philately of:

Ascension
The Cameroons
Gambia
Gold Coast/Ghana
Nigeria
St. Helena
Sierra Leone
Togo
Tristan da Cunha/Gough Island

See also
 Philip O. Beale

References

External links
Official website.

Philatelic organisations based in the United Kingdom
1950 establishments in the United Kingdom
Philately of Nigeria
Philately of Ghana
Philately of Ascension Island
Philately of Saint Helena
Philately of Tristan da Cunha
Philately of Togo
Philately of Sierra Leone
Philately of the Gambia